Matthew Olawale Olosunde (born March 7, 1998) is an American soccer player who plays for Preston North End as a right-back.

Club career

New York Red Bulls 
Born in Philadelphia and raised in Trenton, New Jersey, Olosunde began his career at New York Red Bulls Academy as a right-winger, and represented the club's under-16 and under-18 academy teams.

On August 16, 2014, he played 71 minutes for the New York Red Bulls Reserves in a 1–0 win over the Wilmington Hammerheads in the United Soccer League.

Having verbally committed to play college soccer at Duke University, Olosunde left the Red Bulls following the 2015 FIFA Under-17 World Cup to further his education.

Manchester United 
In January 2016, it was announced that Olosunde would join Premier League club Manchester United. It was reported that the club had offered him online courses at the University of Oxford to persuade him to join. He received international clearance and officially joined the team on March 11.

He initially joined the Under-18 set-up, and was promoted to the Under-23 team ahead of the 2016–17 season. He made 18 appearances in his inaugural Premier League 2 campaign.

In April 2017, Olosunde was nominated for the club's Goal of the Month Award for his solo effort against Real Salt Lake in the Dallas Cup.

The following month, he traveled with the first team squad to Premier League games against Arsenal and Tottenham Hotspur. In June 2019, Olosunde was released by Manchester United.

Rotherham United
On July 5, 2019, Olosunde signed a two-year contract with Rotherham United. He scored his first goal for the club, and his first professional goal, in an FA Cup tie against Everton on January 9, 2021. On June 7, 2021 it was announced that he would leave the club as a free agent at the end of the month, having turned down a new contract offer.

Preston North End
On June 30, 2021, it was announced that Olosunde had agreed to join Preston North End on a two year deal. In his first year, Olosunde played in only 2 games after suffering from Achilles tendon and Groin injuries for most of the season.

International career
Olosunde has played for the United States at several youth levels. For the United States under-17, he played 22 matches and was part of the 21-player roster that represented United States at the 2015 FIFA U-17 World Cup in Chile. He only appeared in the team's first match against Nigeria. Due to his heritage, he is also eligible to represent Nigeria at the international level.

He made his senior debut for the United States on May 28, 2018, coming on as a 74th-minute substitute against Bolivia.

Career statistics

References

External links
 
 Profile at ManUtd.com
 Profile at USSoccer.com
 Profile at FIFA.com

1998 births
Living people
American soccer players
American expatriate soccer players
Manchester United F.C. players
Rotherham United F.C. players
Preston North End F.C. players
Soccer players from Trenton, New Jersey
Expatriate footballers in England
American sportspeople of Nigerian descent
United States men's international soccer players
United States men's under-20 international soccer players
United States men's youth international soccer players
African-American soccer players
Association football fullbacks
United States men's under-23 international soccer players
21st-century African-American sportspeople